Occasional Rain is a 1972 studio album from American musician Terry Callier. Released by Cadet Records, it is Callier's second album and the first in the trilogy that he recorded in short succession for Cadet with producer Charles Stepney. It has received positive critical reception.

Critical reception

The editorial staff of AllMusic gave the release 4.5 out of five stars, with Thom Jurek singling out several tracks for praise and summing up the album as "transcendent". In Pitchforks introduction to psychedelic folk, Grayson Haver Currin notes this album and its title track in particular as must-hear songs to understand the genre.

Track listing
All songs written by Terry Callier, except where noted.
"Segue #1– Go Head On"– 0:38
"Ordinary Joe"– 4:19
"Golden Circle #317"– 3:33
"Segue #5– Go Head On"– 0:38
"Trance on Sedgewick Street"– 6:17
"Do You Finally Need a Friend" (Callier, Charles "Chas" Jones, Carry Wade)– 5:42
"Segue #4– Go Head On"– 0:38
"Sweet Edie-D"– 5:00
"Occasional Rain"– 4:03
"Segue #2– Go Head On"– 0:38
"Blues for Marcus"– 3:29
"Lean On Me"– 6:28
"Last Segue– Go Head On"– 0:38

Personnel
Terry Callier– guitar, vocals
Robert Crowder– drums
Kitty Haywood– soprano vocals
Earl Madison– cello on "Trance on Sedgewick Street" and "Blues for Marcus"
Michael Mendel– art direction, photography
Leonardo Pirani– piano
Minnie Riperton– soprano vocals
Sydney Simms– bass guitar
Gary Starr– engineering
Charles Stepney– harpsichord, organ, production
Shirley Wahls– contralto vocals

References

External links

Entry at Rate Your Music

1972 albums
Albums produced by Charles Stepney
Cadet Records albums
Psychedelic folk albums
Psychedelic music albums by American artists
Psychedelic soul albums
Terry Callier albums